The 5th Cavalry Brigade was a cavalry brigade of the British Army.  It served in the Napoleonic Wars (notably at the Battle of Waterloo), in the First World War on the Western Front where it was initially independent before being assigned to the 2nd Cavalry Division, and with the 1st Cavalry Division during the Second World War.

History

Napoleonic Wars
From June 1809, Wellington organized his cavalry into one, later two, cavalry divisions (1st and 2nd) for the Peninsular War. These performed a purely administrative, rather than tactical, role; the normal tactical headquarters were provided by brigades commanding two, later usually three, regiments. The cavalry brigades were named for the commanding officer, rather than numbered.  For the Hundred Days Campaign, he numbered his British cavalry brigades in a single sequence, 1st to 7th.  The 5th Cavalry Brigade consisted of:
7th (The Queen's Own) Regiment of (Light) Dragoons (Hussars)
15th (The King's) Regiment of (Light) Dragoons (Hussars)
2nd Hussars, King's German Legion
It was commanded by Sir John Colquhoun Grant (British cavalry general). The 13th Regiment of Light Dragoons was attached to the brigade (from 7th Cavalry Brigade) in the absence of the 2nd Hussars, KGL.

The brigade took part in the Battle of Waterloo.  During the battle, the 7th Hussars suffered 155 casualties (56 killed, 99 wounded), the 15th Hussars 79 (23 killed, 51 wounded, 5 missing) and the 13th Light Dragoons 108 (12 killed, 78 wounded, 18 missing). This represented a loss rate of about 27%.

First World War

Mobilization
5th Cavalry Brigade was a peacetime formation of the British Army, based in Northern and Eastern Commands.  At the outbreak of the war, it was headquartered at York and commanded the 2nd Dragoons (York), 12th Lancers (Norwich), 20th Hussars (Colchester) and 5th Signal Troop, Royal Engineers (York).  Ipswich-based V Brigade, RHA (G and O Batteries) was attached. On mobilization, the brigade took on a role independent of The Cavalry Division.  It moved to France in August 1914 with its three cavalry regiments and signal troop, and with the addition of J Battery, RHA, 4th Field Troop, Royal Engineers, and 5th Cavalry Brigade Field Ambulance.

Early Actions
In its independent role, the brigade took part in the Battle of Mons (23–24 August), Cerizy (28 August), the Retreat from Mons (23 August–5 September) and in the Battle of the Marne (6–9 September). On 6 September, it joined 3rd Cavalry Brigade in Gough's Command (under 3rd Cavalry Brigade's Br-Gen Hubert Gough).  As part of Gough's Command, it took part in the First Battle of the Aisne (12–15 September).  On 13 September, Gough's Command was redesignated as 2nd Cavalry Division with the addition of divisional troops (RHA, RE, etc.). It remained with 2nd Cavalry Division on the Western Front until the end of the war.

2nd Cavalry Division
In 1914, the brigade, with the division, took part in First Battle of Ypres, notably the battle of Gheluvelt (29–31 October).  In 1915, the division was in action at the Battle of Neuve Chapelle (10–12 March 1915) and the Second Battle of Ypres notable the Battle of St Julien (26 April–3 May) and the Battle of Bellewaarde Ridge (24–25 May).

On 26 February 1916, a Machine Gun Squadron was formed from the machine gun sections of the brigade's constituent regiments.

1916 saw no notable actions, but in 1917 the division saw action in the Battle of Arras (First Battle of the Scarpe, 9–11 April). and the Battle of Cambrai (the Tank Attack of 20–21 November, the Capture of Bourlon Wood of 24–28 November and the German Counter-Attack of 30 November–3 December). At other times, the brigade formed a dismounted unit and served in the trenches as a regiment under the command of the brigadier.

War of movement
1918 saw the return of the war of movement and the division took part in the First Battle of the Somme notably the Battle of St Quentin (21–23 March), the Battle of the Lys (Battle of Hazebrouck of 14–15 April), the Battle of Amiens (8–11 August) and the Second Battle of the Somme (Battle of Albert of 21–23 August and the Second Battle of Bapaume of 31 August–3 September).

The division was then split up with the 5th Cavalry Brigade serving with Fourth Army. It took part in the battles of the Hindenburg Line: the battles of St. Quentin Canal (29 September–2 October), Beaurevoir Line (3–5 October) and Cambrai (8–9 October); and in the Pursuit to the Selle (9–12 October).  Its final action was to take part in the Advance in Picardy (17 October–11 November) including the Battle of the Sambre (4 November).

Armistice
At the Armistice, the brigade had reached Clairfayts with Fourth Army.  On 15 November, the division was re-assembled near Maubeuge and ordered to advance into Germany as an advance screen for Fourth Army and form part of the Occupation Force. The move began on 17 November, Ciney and Rochefort were reached five days later and the 5th Cavalry Brigade crossed the German border south of St. Vith on 1 December.

In late December, the division moved to winter quarters south and south-east of Liège.  It remained here until 30 January 1919 when it exchanged regiments with 1st and 3rd Cavalry Divisions then gradually moved back to England.  The Division ceased to exist at midnight 31 March / 1 April 1919.

Order of battle

Second World War
The 5th Cavalry Brigade was a pre-war First Line Territorial Army cavalry brigade reformed in 1920. On the outbreak of the war, it was part of Northern Command and commanded the Yorkshire Hussars, the Sherwood Rangers Yeomanry and the Queen's Own Yorkshire Dragoons. It joined the 1st Cavalry Division when it was formed on 31 October 1939.

With the 1st Cavalry Division, the 5th Cavalry Brigade departed the United Kingdom in January 1940, transited across France, and arrived in Palestine on 29 January 1940.  It served as a garrison force under British Forces, Palestine and Trans-Jordan.

On 1 August 1941, the division was converted to the 10th Armoured Division and the Brigade units were split up.  On 23 April 1942, the headquarters was redesignated as Headquarters Desert (5 Cav) Brigade and performed administrative and Internal Security Duties in Ninth Army.  On 2 June it was redesignated as headquarters 8th Division.

Order of battle
Unlike in the First World War, when brigade compositions rarely changed, there was considerable movement of units between the 4th, 5th and 6th Cavalry Brigades in the Second World War.

Of the three regiments with the brigade when it was broken up:
the Cheshire Yeomanry was the last but one mounted cavalry regiment in the British Army. It formed 5th Lines of Communications Signal Regiment in North Africa until 1944 and later 17th Lines of Communications Signal Regiment in the North West Europe campaign.
the Yorkshire Dragoons had the distinction of being the last active Cavalry unit of the British Army, then had a number of different roles Anti-Tank Artillery during the Second Battle of El Alamein, then converted into an Infantry unit part of 18th Infantry Brigade.  They were later redesignated as 9th Battalion, Kings Own Yorkshire Light Infantry.
the North Somerset Yeomanry formed 4th Air Formations Signal Regiment (to provide communications between the Army and the RAF) in North Africa and later in Sicily and Italy. It was redesignated as 14th Air Formations Signal Regiment and served throughout the North West Europe campaign.

Commanders
The 5th Cavalry Brigade had the following commanders during the First World War:

The 5th Cavalry Brigade had the following commanders during the Second World War:

See also

 Order of battle of the Waterloo campaign
 British Army during World War I
 British Cavalry Corps order of battle 1914
 British cavalry during the First World War
 List of British brigades of the Second World War
 Structure of the British Army in 1939

Notes

References

Bibliography

External links
 
 
 

5
Military units and formations established in 1815
Military units and formations disestablished in 1815
Military units and formations established in 1914
Military units and formations disestablished in 1919
Military units and formations established in 1920
1920 establishments in the United Kingdom
Military units and formations disestablished in 1942
1815 establishments in the United Kingdom